Polypoetes bistellata is a moth of the family Notodontidae. It is found in Argentina.

References

Moths described in 1902
Notodontidae of South America